KBLL (1240 AM, "Newstalk 1240") was a radio station licensed to serve Helena, Montana. The station was owned by Cherry Creek Radio. It aired a News/Talk format.

Notable syndicated programming on the station included shows hosted by Rush Limbaugh, Michael Medved, and Jerry Doyle. The station was also one of the most active in Montana for local sports broadcasting, featuring Capital high school football and basketball, plus American Legion baseball. The sports "voice" and news director was former Chicago White Sox, Bears, and Blackhawk broadcaster Jay Scott. The station was also a leader in web-streaming its sports broadcasts. In 2008, Jay Scott was presented the "Montana Newscast of the Year" award by the Montana Broadcasters Association, after two runner-up awards the previous two years. He was the runner-up for "Montana Sportscaster of the Year" in 2009, 2010, 2011, 2012, 2013, 2014, 2015, and 2016.

History

The station began broadcasting in 1937 as KPFA. On November 4, 1946, the call letters were changed to KXLJ, and on March 29, 1961 were changed again to KBLL.

In April 2004, a deal was reached for KBLL to be acquired by Cherry Creek Radio from Holter Broadcasting Corp. (Jan Holter-Lambert, president) as part of a 2-station deal with a total reported sale price of $2.8 million. KBLL went ceased broadcasting on November 4, 2014 after losing its transmitter site. Its programming, as well as the programming of sister station KCAP (1340 AM), was then moved to KMTX (950 AM), which Cherry Creek Radio purchased and relaunched as a new KCAP. The KBLL license was canceled by the FCC on July 5, 2016, due to the length of time for which the station had remained silent.

References

External links
FCC Station Search Details: DKBLL (Facility ID: 27515)
FCC History Cards for KBLL (covering 1936-1980 as KPFA / KXLJ / KBLL)

BLL
Defunct radio stations in the United States
Radio stations established in 1937
1937 establishments in Montana
Radio stations disestablished in 2016
2016 disestablishments in Montana
BLL